Blagoy Blagoev (born 4 December 1956) is a retired Bulgarian weightlifter. Between 1976 and 1984 he claimed seven gold and five silver medals at the Summer Olympics and World and European championships. He set 18 world records. 13 of them were in the snatch. His last snatch world record was 195.5 kg in the 90 kg weight class, set on 1 May 1983 in Varna and remains the heaviest weight ever snatched by a middle heavyweight.

Blagoev was a two time Olympian. He represented his native country Bulgaria at the Summer Olympics in Montreal (1976) and in Moscow (1980). He won a silver Olympic medal in the light heavyweight 1980. Blagoy Blagoev competed in the 82.5 kg and 90 kg weight classes. He was a 3x World Champion (1981, 1982, 1983) in the middle heavyweight. He won 4 gold European medals – as a light heavyweight in 1979 and as a middle heavyweight in 1981-1983.
Blagoev also won three consecutive World Cups in Varna, Bulgaria in 1982-1984 and 5 Bulgarian Championships (1979, 1981-1984). He later coached the Australian Paralympic Powerlifting Team in the 1990s to early 2000s.

Weightlifting achievements 
 Silver medallist in Olympic Games (1980);
 Senior World champion (1981,1982,1983);
 Silver medallist World Championships 1979,1980
 Weightlifter of the Year 1982 and 1983
 World Cup Winner 1982 and 1983
 Athlete of the year Bulgaria 1982
 Athlete of the Balkans 1983 
 Senior European champion (1979, 1981, 1982 and 1983);
 Silver medallist in Senior European Championships (1976 and 1984);
 All-time senior world record holder in snatch (195.5 kg, competing at 90 kg);
 Best Sinclair lift of all times 195.5 kg in the Snatch at 90 kg bodyweight. 
 Set 49 junior and senior ratified world records in 1975–1983.
 Master of Sports (Bulgaria) 1974
 Honored Master of Sports (Bulgaria) 1979
 Honored Coach (Bulgaria) 1987

Career bests 
82.5 kg class:
Snatch 175 1979 Bulgaria, 1980 Moscow 
Clean and Jerk 210 1979 Bulgaria
Total 385 1979 Bulgaria

90 kg class:
 Snatch: 195.5 kg in 1983 in Varna
 Clean and jerk: 228.5 kg in 1983 in Varna.
 Total: 420.0 kg in 1983 in Varna.
 World Championships Best:
82.5 kg 175+197.5 Moscow 1980, 
90 kg 190+227.5 Moscow 1983
 European Championships Best- 
82.5 kg 172.5+207.5 Varna 1979,
90 kg 190+227.5 Moscow 1983, 192.5+225 Vittorio, Spain.1984
 World Cup Best
90 kg Halmstad 195+217.5 1982

References

External links

 
 
 
 

1956 births
Living people
Bulgarian male weightlifters
Olympic weightlifters of Bulgaria
Olympic silver medalists for Bulgaria
Olympic medalists in weightlifting
Weightlifters at the 1976 Summer Olympics
Weightlifters at the 1980 Summer Olympics
Medalists at the 1980 Summer Olympics
Competitors stripped of Summer Olympics medals
World record setters in weightlifting
World Weightlifting Championships medalists
European Weightlifting Championships medalists
People from Veliki Preslav
Bulgarian emigrants to Australia
20th-century Bulgarian people